Ruqayya bint al-Ḥusayn (born on the 20th of Rajab, 56 AH – 5 Rabi' al-Thani, 60 / 61 AH or 676 CE; died on the 10th of Safar, 60 / 61 AH or 680 / 681 CE), was the daughter of Husayn ibn Ali and Rubab bint Imra al-Qais. Her brothers included Ali Zayn al-Abidin, Ali al-Akbar, and Ali al-Asghar. Her sisters included Fatima al-Sughra and Fatima al-Kubra, with the latter also being called 'Sakina'.

Life
Ruqayya (Arabic: رقيّة) is an Arabic female given name that means to "rise, ascent, ascend", or "chant or recite Divine Words". It is derived either from the Arabic "Ruqia", meaning "rise, ascent", or from "ruqyah", telling "spell, charm, incantation". According to Najim al-Din Tabasi, the name of the fourth daughter of Husayn is Ruqayya. The name of Ruqayya and the events that took place for her in the ruins of Sham were mentioned in other books including Kamil Baha'i by  Imad al-Din Tabari, Bihar al-Anwar by Mohammad-Baqer Majlesi, and Lohoof by Sayyed Ibn Tawus. However, in mentioning the names of the children of Husayn, Al-Shaykh Al-Mufid mentioned just two daughters named Fatima and Sukayna binte Husayn. After the Battle of the Karbala, she was taken to Suriya with other members family of Muhammad, the prophet of Islam, and the heads of those murdered by the forces of Yazid as a captive. Taking hadith and history sources into consideration, a daughter of Husayn (who was named Ruqayya or Fatima) died near the head of her father in the ruins of Sham. According to different narrations, she was three, or four, at the time of her death.

Narrative 

The story of Ruqayya is one of the many romanticized stories that Muslims tell about Husayn and his martyrdom at the hands of Yazid's troops. The Battle of Karbala and the subsequent events at the court of Yazid are explained and mourned annually during the commemoration of the 10th of Muharram, also known as "'Ashura".

Journey to Iraq and Shaam 

She accompanied her father when he travelled from Mecca to Kufa in Iraq. On the 2nd of Muharram, 61 AH (680 CE), Husayn and 72 of his family members and companions were forced to camp in the plains of Karbala by Yazid's army of 30,000 men. Yazid ibn Mu'awiya was the practical Caliph who desired religious authority by obtaining the allegiance of Husayn, but the Imam would not give up his principles. After being deprived of food and water for 3 days, on the 10th of Muharram, the Imam's household was attacked, a number of his companions were killed, and the survivors were made captives. The survivors included the Imam's sisters, wife, and daughters, including Ruqayya, relatives of companions of the Imam, and his son, Ali Zayn al-Abidin, who did not participate in the battle, due to an illness. Ruqayya, as with others, had grieved over the killings. They had also suffered from thirst.

The survivors were marched by Yazid's army from Karbala to Kufa, where the women received water from a sympathetic woman, and then to Damascus in Shaam, Syria. There was a lack of pity on the captors' part during the journey. Even in these times of hardship and misery, Ruqayya was sympathetic to others, such as her mother, whom she consoled her mother on the death of Ali al-Asghar.

Death
Zaynab, Ruqayya, and the other survivors of Husayn's army, most of them women and children, were marched to Damascus, Yazid's capital, where they were held captive.

Mosque 

According to ShiaIslamic narrations that are commemorated every year on the occasion of Ashura, after enduring the Battle of Karbala and the torturous journey to Damascus that followed it, Ruqayya died at the age of four weeping over her father's head in Yazid palace hall where the prisoner initially stayed and, her body was originally buried at a nearby site. Centuries later, an ʿĀlim (Arabic: عَالِم, Scholar) had a dream in which Ruqayya asked him to move her body from the grave to another site, due to water pouring into her grave. He and some people opened the grave and saw that groundwater was indeed entering the grave, besides that her body was still intact. Ruqqaya's body was moved from its original burial place, the dungeon, and reburied where her Mosque is now located.
 
The mosque was built around the mausoleum in 1985 and exhibits a modern version of Iranian architecture, with a substantial amount of mirror and gold work. There is a small mosque area adjoining the shrine room, along with a small courtyard in front. This mosque is found a short distance from the Umayyad Mosque and the Al-Hamidiyah Souq in central Damascus.

Family tree

See also 
 Adnanites
 Arabs
 Banu Hashim
 Family tree of Husayn ibn Ali
 Fatimah
 Fatimah bint Musa
 Quraysh
 Sakina bint Husayn
 Ruqayya bint Ali
 Semite
 Umm ʿAmmar Sumayyah Bint Khabbat, wife of Yasir ibn Amir ibn Malik al-ʿAnsi
 Yahya ibn Zekariyyah

References

Bibliography 
 Momen, Moojan An Introduction to Shi'a Islam, Yale University Press, 1985.

External links 
 Sakina 
 Sakina, the young Hashemite princess 
  Poem for Bibi Sakina(A.S) by Mahmood Abu Shahbaaz Londoni

Arab women
Muslim martyrs
Family of Muhammad
Battle of Karbala
676 births
Women in medieval warfare
Women in war in the Middle East
7th-century women
Muslim figures favored in Shia Islam
7th-century Arabs
8th-century Arabs
Husayn ibn Ali
Arab women in war
Child deaths